Waukesha North High School is one of three high schools located in Waukesha, Wisconsin. Operated by the Waukesha School District, the school opened in mid-year, at the start of the second semester, during the 1974-1975 school year. The school is part of the Wisconsin Interscholastic Athletic Association and the Classic 8 Conference in athletics. North's nickname is the "Northstars" and the school mascot is the polar bear, "Sparky"

The school has a rotating schedule and advisory program. Its marching band won the WSMA state marching band championship every year from 2007 to 2015.

Extracurricular activities 
Waukesha North is a contributor to Invisible Children, Inc., and has raised money for Layibi Secondary School, in northern Uganda.

FIRST Robotics 
Waukesha North participates in CORE 2062, a FIRST Robotics Competition team. The sixteen-year-old team won the Rookie All Star Award in 2007, the Wisconsin Regional (Milwaukee) in 2008, and the 10,000 Lakes Regional (Minneapolis) in 2010.

Music 
The music program at Waukesha North High School includes band, choir, guitar, orchestra, and jazz ensemble. Each music area offers varied extra-curricular entities, ranging from musical theatre to pep band to solo ensemble experiences.

Drama 
The drama program at Waukesha North does three shows per school year, two plays during the fall and spring season, and a musical during the winter. In 2022 the Northstar Drama Club put on a production of Chicago (Cast: McKenna Camacho; Velma Kelly, Emma Schoultz; Roxie Hart, Aidan Reilly; Billy Flynn, Michael Alvarez; Amos Hart, Jordan James; Matron “Mama” Morton), and won three nominations from the Jerry Awards.

Notable alumni 
 Erik Bickerstaff - former NFL player (Class of 1998)
 Jeff Hanson - musician (Class of 1996)
 Kurt Larson - former NFL player
 Johnny Lechner - perpetual college student (Class of 1994)
 Edmund C. Moy - former director of the United States Mint (Class of 1975)
 Jon Richards - Wisconsin politician
 Nick Viall - former contestant on The Bachelorette and The Bachelor on Season 21 of the show (Class of 1999).

Notes

External links 
Waukesha North High School website

Public high schools in Wisconsin
Schools in Waukesha County, Wisconsin